Elizabeth Robyn Harvey (born 19 October 1946) is an Australian politician. She was an Australian Labor Party member of the Australian House of Representatives from 1987 to 1990.

Harvey was born in Adelaide on 19 October 1946. She completed a diploma in secondary teaching at Adelaide Teachers College and a Bachelor of Arts at the University of Adelaide.

Harvey won the south Adelaide seat of Hawker as the Labor candidate at the 1987 federal election. Harvey was defeated for the same seat by Liberal Chris Gallus at the 1990 federal election by an extremely narrow 14 votes.

Elizabeth has since worked as a ministerial staffer, public servant, teacher and writer. She has published on a blog her novel, Snowflake's Hope, a fictionalised account of her experiences as a Federal MP.

References

External links
 Parliamentary Handbook: Historical Information on the Australian Parliament
 On line novel

1946 births
Living people
Australian Labor Party members of the Parliament of Australia
Members of the Australian House of Representatives
Members of the Australian House of Representatives for Hawker
Women members of the Australian House of Representatives
20th-century Australian politicians
20th-century Australian women politicians